Sobrassada in Balearic or Sobrasada in Spanish, is a raw, cured sausage from the Balearic Islands (Spain) made with ground pork, paprika and salt and other spices. The chemical principle that makes  is the dehydration of meat under certain weather conditions (high humidity and mild cold) which are typical of the late Balearic autumn.

History
After centuries of Muslim rule of the Iberian Peninsula, pork consumption returned to the region in the Middle Ages. Paprika was added after the spice was brought back from the Americas in the 15th century. Sobrassada is thought to have originated and expanded, as a culinary concept, in the Crown of Aragon-controlled Western Mediterranean (Sicily, Balearic Islands, Sardinia) after the 14th century, as similar sausages are still made in this region.

In a traditional Mediterranean diet, containing little meat, as Mallorca had until the 1950s, sobrassada and related pork sausages were the main and sometimes only sources of pork for Mallorcans. Larger meat cuts such as pork or lamb roasts, pork steaks or beef cuts were largely festive dishes, or restricted to the well-off.

Ingredients and varieties
Sobrassada is made with a choice of pork loin, pork bacon (locally called ), minced and mixed with paprika, salt and black pepper at the ends (to deter insects). Then the mixture is put into a pork intestine, and hung from a pole for some weeks until it is cured.

Small, thin sobrassades are called , and are made from the small intestine. Thicker varieties take longer to cure, staggering its consumption through the year (thinner during winter, thicker during summer-autumn).

Sobrassada outside the Balearic Islands
Other areas in the Mediterranean, apart from the Balearic Islands, have close links to sobrassada.

In Catalonia, due to the shared history and culture with the Balearic Islands, sobrassada and other native pork products can be found. The eastern Pyrenees are known for a mountain version of sobrassada.

The village of Tàrbena, in the province of Alicante, was re-populated after the expulsion of the Moriscos with colonists from Majorca, who brought along several traditions from the island, including their own variant of the Catalan language and foods such as sobrasada, still made there.

In colonial Algeria, sobrassada, named , was part of the pied-noir cuisine and extremely popular until the independence and re-Islamisation of the country; pork is forbidden by Islam. Today  can only be found in continental France, in butcher shops run by pieds-noirs. Algerians however, enjoy a halal version of the  made with beef instead of pork.

On the island of Sicily and in Calabria, a similar sausage has been made under the name  since the 15th century or longer.

See also
Soppressata
Nduja

References

External links 
http://www.sobrasadademallorca.org/ The regulatory board website
https://web.archive.org/web/20051202010101/http://www.spain.info/TourSpain/Gastronomia/Productos%2By%2BRecetas/Productos/D/0/Sobrasada

Spanish sausages
Balearic cuisine
Fermented sausages